The GWR Autocoach (or auto-trailer) is a type of coach that was used by the Great Western Railway for push-pull trains powered by a steam locomotive. The distinguishing design feature of an autocoach is the driving cab at one end, allowing the driver to control the train without needing to be located in the cab of the steam locomotive. This eliminates the need to run the engine round to the other end of the coach at the end of each journey.

When one or more autocoaches are connected to a suitably equipped steam locomotive, the combination is known as an auto-train, or, historically, a railmotor train. A steam locomotive provided with the equipment to be used as an autotrain is said to be auto-fitted.

The autocoach is the forerunner of the driving trailer used with push–pull trains.

Design features

A locomotive fitted with additional control equipment is used to power the autotrain. When running 'autocoach first', the regulator is operated by a linkage to a rotating shaft running the length of the locomotive, passing below the cab floor. This engages (via a telescopic coupling) with another shaft running the full length below the floor of the autocoach. This shaft is turned by a second regulator lever in the cab of the autocoach. (See photograph sequence below.) The driver can operate the regulator, brakes and whistle from the far (cab) end of the autocoach; the fireman remains on the locomotive and (in addition to firing) also controls the valve gear settings. The driver can also warn of the train's approach using a large mechanical gong, prominently mounted high on the cab end of the autocoach, which is operated by stamping on a pedal on the floor of the cab. The driver, guard and fireman communicate with each other by an electric bell system.

In operation

If more than one autocoach was used, the locomotive would usually be marshalled between the coaches, as 'play' in the control linkages could otherwise make operation difficult. This arrangement was not always possible where turntables were not convenient for turning coaches and hence up to two autocoaches could follow or lead a locomotive with cab ends away from the locomotive.

Many GWR suburban services around Plymouth were formed of fixed autotrain formations of four autocoaches, two each side of the locomotive with cabs leading in each direction. When these were introduced in 1906, experiments were made to harmonise the appearance of the locomotive in the middle of the train by cutting down the side tanks and encasing the entire locomotive in a square bodyshell of the same basic design, height and width as the coaches, complete with 'windows' and the same chocolate/cream paint livery. Two 2021 Class and two 517 Class engines were modified in this way.

Accidents and incidents
 On 15 April 1923, carriage No. 70 formed a passenger train hauled by locomotive No. 215. The train was in a head-on collision with a freight train at Curry Rivel, Somerset due to a signalman's error. Nine people were injured.
 On 16 November 1937, an empty train in a siding at the eastern end of Ealing Broadway station (between platforms 2 and 3) was waiting to be called into the platform to form the next service to  when the driver started the train in thick fog without noticing either that the points were not set for the platform nor that the signals were against him, and the auto-trailer crashed into the signal box. This auto-trailer, no. 211 of Diagram A31, had been converted in August 1935 from steam rail motor no. 81 (Diagram Q1); it was repaired after the accident, and was not withdrawn until March 1959.

Fleet list

Auto-fitted locomotives
Several locomotive classes included examples equipped to work in autotrains at different times. These included:

References

Further reading

External links 

 West Somerset Railway – Photo gallery: Restoration of Autocoach no 169 – Includes many pictures of the innards of an autocoach

Autocoach